Elections for the Constituent Assembly of the Indian state of Jammu and Kashmir were held in September–October 1951. Sheikh Abdullah was appointed Prime Minister of Jammu and Kashmir. Following frictions with various groups such as the Jammu Praja Parishad agitation, Abdullah was dismissed in August 1953 and imprisoned. Bakshi Ghulam Mohammad was appointed as the next Prime Minister.

Background
The princely state of Jammu and Kashmir acceded to the Union of India on 26 October 1947. Shortly afterwards, the Maharaja of Jammu and Kashmir appointed Sheikh Abdullah as the Head of Emergency Administration, who ran the affairs in the Kashmir Valley during the Indo-Pakistani War of 1947. Following the cease-fire achieved on 1 January 1948, Sheikh Abdullah was appointed as the Prime Minister of the state on 5 March 1948. He chose an eight-member Cabinet, with the other members being:
 Bakshi Ghulam Mohammad – Deputy Prime Minister
 Mirza Afzal Beg – Revenue
 Sardar Budh Singh – Health and Rehabilitation
 Ghulam Mohammed Sadiq – Development
 Shyam Lal Saraf – Civil Supplies and Local Self-Government
 Girdhari Lal Dogra – Finance
 Pir Mohammad Khan – Education
The Jammu & Kashmir National Conference, the party of Sheikh Abdullah, announced on 27 October 1950 its decision to convene a Constituent Assembly for the state of Jammu and Kashmir.

Pakistan immediately raised a complaint in the United Nations Security Council stating that India was convening a Constituent Assembly to "ratify the formal accession of the State to India" in contravention of the Security Council resolutions. India reassured all parties that the decision of the Constituent Assembly would not affect India's commitments in the Security Council. The Security Council took note of the development in its 30 March 1951 resolution and reminded both the Indian and Pakistani governments of the past resolutions of the Security Council and affirmed that the decisions of the Constituent Assembly would not be binding.

On 30 April, the Prince Regent Karan Singh issued a proclamation announcing the elections for the Constituent Assembly based on the adult franchise by secret ballot. The elections took place in September–October 1951.
The Constituent Assembly was to have a nominal membership of 100 members, of which 25 seats were allocated to Azad Kashmir under Pakistani control (which were never filled). Of the remaining 75 seats, Kashmir was allocated 43 seats, Ladakh 2 seats, and Jammu 30 seats.

The election
The elections were conducted by the State's election and franchise commissioner.
The process of elections was highly irregular. All the 43 seats allocated to Kashmir went to the National Conference candidates, who were elected unopposed a week before the date of the elections. In Jammu, 13 candidates belonging to the Jammu Praja Parishad had their nominations rejected. Praja Parishad then boycotted the elections, alleging the Government's illegal practices and official interference. Two independent candidates dropped out at the last moment, giving a clean sweep to the National Conference. In Ladakh, the Head Lama, Kushak Bakula and an associate won seats, as nominal members of the National Conference.

Thus, the National Conference won all the 75 seats to the Constituent Assembly, which convened on 31 October 1951.

Scholar Sumantra Bose states that the manner of elections indicated that the National Conference elites wanted to govern Jammu and Kashmir as a party state. Their slogan was "One Leader, One Party, One Programme". Balraj Puri, journalist and secular activist from Jammu, is said to have argued with Jawaharlal Nehru that Ghulam Mohiuddin Karra's group in the Kashmir Valley should be allowed to function as an opposition group in the state. While Nehru agreed with the principle he stated that nothing should be done to weaken Sheikh Abdullah.

The Jammu Praja Parishad, having been denied opportunities for the democratic opposition, took to the streets. It demanded full integration of the state with India to ensure the "legitimate democratic rights of the people" against the "anti-Dogra government of Sheikh Abdullah". The conflict with the Praja Parishad eventually led to the termination of Sheikh Abdullah's rule.

Government formation

Sheikh Abdullah ministry 
Sheikh Abdullah continued as the Prime Minister of the State. Two members of the erstwhile Cabinet from the Jammu province, Sardar Budh Singh and Pir Mohammad Khan were dropped. Ghulam Mohammed Sadiq stepped down from his Cabinet duties to serve as the Chairman of the Constituent Assembly. The remaining members of the Cabinet were:
 Sheikh Abdullah – Prime Minister
 Bakshi Ghulam Mohammad – Deputy Prime Minister
 Mirza Afzal Beg
 Shyam Lal Saraf
 Girdhari Lal Dogra
Later D. P. Dhar, Mubarak Shah, Major Piara Singh and Ghulam Mohiuddin Hamdani were appointed as Deputy Ministers.

Bakshi Ghulam Mohammad ministry 
Following intense frictions with the Jammu Praja Parishad in Jammu and the Head Lama Kushak Bakula of Ladakh, as well as ongoing frictions with the Union government, Sheikh Abdullah was dismissed from the post of Prime Minister by the Sadr-e-Riyasat (Head of State) Karan Singh in August 1953. Abdullah was also arrested on conspiracy charges. The Deputy Prime Minister Bakshi Ghulam Mohammad was sworn in as the next Prime Minister. His Cabinet consisted of:
 Bakshi Ghulam Mohammad – Prime Minister
 Ghulam Mohammed Sadiq – Education
 Shyam Lal Saraf – Development
 Girdhari Lal Dogra – Finance
 Syed Mir Qasim – Revenue
Kushak Bakula was appointed as a deputy minister and he pledged his support for the new government.

Bakshi Ghulam Mohammad continued as the Prime Minister for the remaining six-year term of the Constituent Assembly. The Assembly continued with its mission of formulating the State Constitution, which was adopted on 17 November 1956, coming into effect on 26 January 1957.

References

Bibliography
 
 
 

1951 in India
Jammu and Kashmir
1951
1951